Zammeh and Zameh and Zemeh may refer to:
 Zammeh, Razavi Khorasan
 Zemeh, West Azerbaijan